Glenea intermixta is a species of beetle in the family Cerambycidae. It was described by Per Olof Christopher Aurivillius in 1926.

Subspecies
 Glenea intermixta indiscalis Breuning, 1956
 Glenea intermixta intermixta Aurivillius, 1926

References

intermixta
Beetles described in 1926